The 2023 Sydney Roosters season is the 116th in the club's history. They will compete in the National Rugby League's 2023 Telstra Premiership. The Captain James Tedesco retains his club role for the 3rd consecutive year while Head Coach Trent Robinson maintains his position for the 11th consecutive season.

Player Movement
These movements happened across the previous season, off-season and pre-season.

Gains

Losses

Pre-Season Challenge

Regular Season

2023 Squad

References

Sydney Roosters seasons
Sydney Roosters season
2023 NRL Women's season